Peter Alma (18 January 1886 Medan – 23 May 1969 Amsterdam) was a Dutch artist. Alma was born in Medan, Indonesia and attended the Royal Academy of Art, The Hague in 1904. On the recommendation of Franz Seiwert he was employed by the Gesellschafts- und Wirtschaftsmuseum working with Gerd Arntz and Augustin Tschinkel on the development of Isotypes. He travelled to Moscow with Arntz and Otto Neurath to work at IZOSTAT to help them draw up pictorial images for statistics of the Five Year Plans. Alma was a member of Nederlandsche Vereeniging voor Ambachts- en Nijverheidskunst (V.A.N.K.) the Dutch Association for craft and craft art.

Works

Amsterdam Museum
The Amsterdam Museum keeps a number of his works in their depot:
 Pottenbakker
 Another work
 Another work
 Another work
 Another work
 Another work
 Another work

References

1868 births
1969 deaths
19th-century Dutch painters
Dutch male painters
20th-century Dutch painters
Infographics
People from Medan
Royal Academy of Art, The Hague alumni
19th-century Dutch male artists
20th-century Dutch male artists